Watson is an unincorporated community in Shawnee County, Kansas, United States.

Demographics
Watson is part of the Topeka, Kansas Metropolitan Statistical Area.

Education
The community is served by Shawnee Heights USD 450 public school district, and two schools are located in Watson: Shawnee Heights High School and Shawnee Highs Middle School.

References

Further reading

External links
 Shawnee County maps: Current, Historic, KDOT

Unincorporated communities in Kansas
Unincorporated communities in Shawnee County, Kansas
Topeka metropolitan area, Kansas